The Rito Seco Creek Culvert, in San Luis, Colorado, was built as a Works Progress Administration project.  It was listed on the National Register of Historic Places in 2002.

References

CO
Drainage tunnels in the United States
National Register of Historic Places in Costilla County, Colorado